Frank Ottis Fournia (1873-1912) was a private serving in the United States Army during the Spanish–American War, who received the Medal of Honor for bravery.

Biography
Born in Rome, New York in January 1873, Fournia joined the army from Plattsburgh, New York in May 1898. He served in the Spanish–American War with Company H, 21st Infantry Regiment, as a private where he received the Medal of Honor for his actions. He was discharged in November of the same year.

Medal of Honor citation
Rank and organization: Private, Company H, 21st U.S. Infantry. Place and date: At Santiago, Cuba, 1 July 1898. Entered service at: Plattsburg, N.Y. Birth: Rome, N.Y. Date of issue: 22 June 1899.
Citation:

Gallantly assisted in the rescue of the wounded from in front of the lines and while under heavy fire of the enemy.

Fournia died in his hometown on February 28, 1912, and was buried in St. Agnes Cemetery in Menands, New York.

See also

 List of Medal of Honor recipients for the Spanish–American War

References

1873 births
1912 deaths
People from Rome, New York
United States Army Medal of Honor recipients
United States Army soldiers
American military personnel of the Spanish–American War
Burials at St. Agnes Cemetery
Spanish–American War recipients of the Medal of Honor